Gerhardus Cornelis Steenekamp (born ) is a South African rugby union player for the  in the United Rugby Championship . and the  in the Currie Cup. His regular position is loosehead prop.

He signed for the Bulls Super Rugby side for the 2020 Super Rugby season.

Honours
 Currie Cup winner 2021
 Pro14 Rainbow Cup runner-up 2021
 United Rugby Championship runner-up 2021-22

References

1997 births
Living people
Blue Bulls players
Bulls (rugby union) players
Rugby union players from Potchefstroom
Rugby union props
South African rugby union players